Summerhouse may refer to:

Summer house, a type of building
Summerhouse, County Durham, England
Summerhouse, a brick structure located on the United States Capitol grounds
"The Summerhouse", a song by The Divine Comedy (band)

See also
Summerhouse Hill, Folkestone Downs, Kent, England